Lummis House, also known as El Alisal, is a Rustic American Craftsman stone house built by Charles Fletcher Lummis in the late 19th and early 20th centuries. Located on the edge of Arroyo Seco in northeast Los Angeles, California, the house's name means "alder grove" in Spanish.

The property is a Los Angeles Historic-Cultural Monument and on the list of the National Register of Historic Places.

History
Lummis  purchased the  sometime between 1895 and 1897 and named it "El Alisal" in tribute to the thicket of alder and sycamore trees that grew in the arroyo. The  took 13 years to build. The exhibition hall has a concrete floor so that after a party that might include artists, writers and musicians, it could easily be cleaned with a bucket of water. Notable people who stayed in his guest houses included Clarence Darrow, Will Rogers, John Philip Sousa and John Muir. The property was on the edge of the scenic Arroyo Seco and Lummis founded the Arroyo Seco Foundation in 1905 to promote recreational use and preserving habitat.  In 1939, strong consideration was given to creating a theater and Spanish supper room at El Alisal since this was Lummis' wish.  In 1940 the Arroyo Seco Parkway, the first freeway, was built between the house and the newly constructed flood control channel in the arroyo.

In 1965, it became the headquarters for the Historical Society of Southern California and the house was opened to the public. By 2014, the city was concerned that visiting hours were too limited and that the historical group was not truly focused on a partnership with the Parks and Recreation Department. The Historical Society was concerned about the city's expectations that a tenant would invest in the house without committing to a long-term lease. The Historical Society of Southern California left the Lummis House in January 2015. The Lummis House is now operated by the City of Los Angeles Recreation and Parks Department.

Museum

The Lummis House is operated by the city of Los Angeles as a historic house museum.  The exterior of the house is built of river rock and originally contained a stone tower, but that was later demolished.  The interior contains some of Lummis's collection of artifacts, as well as copies of many of his books. The museum is open to the public for tours.

Gardens
The drought-tolerant and California native plants predominate in the gardens and natural landscape around the residence, including namesake El Alisal California Sycamore trees.

California Historical Landmark Marker
California Historical Landmark Marker NO. 531 at the site reads:
NO. 531 LUMMIS HOME - This building was constructed by Charles F. Lummis (1859-1928), author, editor, poet, athlete, librarian, historian, archeologist, etc. He selected this site in 1895 chiefly because of a mammoth, ancient sycamore (El Alisal) which has since died and been replaced by four saplings.

See also
Los Angeles Historic-Cultural Monuments on the East and Northeast Sides
List of Registered Historic Places in Los Angeles

References

External links

Museums in Los Angeles
Historic house museums in California
Historical society museums in California
Arroyo Seco (Los Angeles County)
Highland Park, Los Angeles
Gardens in California
History of Los Angeles
Houses on the National Register of Historic Places in Los Angeles
Los Angeles Historic-Cultural Monuments
Sumner Hunt buildings
Arts and Crafts movement
American Craftsman architecture in California
Rustic architecture in California